Garry Shephard is a Welsh former semi-professional football player, who played as a striker. He was a prolific goalscorer and fans' favourite for non-league sides Newport County and Merthyr.

Personal
Garry is the father of Newport County right-back Liam Shephard and Haverfordwest County midfielder Corey Shephard. Shephard runs a T-shirt/kit supplying and embroidery business in his local Rhondda Valleys

References

External links

Living people
Welsh footballers
Player-coaches
Footballers from Merthyr Tydfil
Merthyr Town F.C. players
Newport County A.F.C. players
1976 births
Association football forwards